JKT Oljoro FC is a Tanzanian football club from Arusha that previously played in the Tanzanian Premier League. In the 2015/16 season they are playing in the Tanzanian First Division League. They play their home matches at the Sheikh Amri Abeid Memorial Stadium in Arusha, Tanzania. Promoted to the Tanzanian Premier League after the 2010/11 season, they finished the 2011/12 season in 6th position playing 26 matches, winning 9, drawing 8 and losing 9, scoring 19, conceding 24 with a goal difference of −5 and 35 points.

Current squad

External links
Logo of Oljoro JKT

References

Football clubs in Tanzania